The Carleton University Students' Association (or CUSA) is a non-profit corporation that represents the undergraduate students at Carleton University in Ottawa, Ontario, Canada.

Governance

Executive
Executive members of CUSA are elected yearly. The executive is responsible for improving CUSA services, working on the issues important to you, and carrying out the daily work of the Association. The 2022/23 executive members are: 
 President – Anastasia Stoikos-Lettieri (she/her)
 VP Internal – Davin Caratao (he/him)
 VP Finance – Steve Mansour (he/him)
 VP Student Issues – Mohamed “Faris” Riazudden (he/him)
 VP Community Engagement – Hallee Kejick (she/her)
 VP Student Life – Anshika Srivastava (she/they)

Council
Council is the highest power within CUSA, as it represents the voice of the student body in the decision-making process of the Association. CUSA Council members are voted in and are accountable to undergraduate students of Carleton University. Seats are distributed based on number of students in the 5 major faculties and several programs at the university. The current council and their constituencies are listed below.

2020/2021 Council Members

Term: May 1, 2020 - April 30, 2021

Faculty of Public Affairs (7)

 Saleh Abdelghany
 Femi Joelle Dadjo
 Halima Diallo 
 Liam Lowe 
 Nicolas Gil Ocampo
 Emily Sowa
 Jordan Vecchio

Faculty of Arts and Social Sciences (6)

 Pierce Burch
 Marina Guadagnin
 Sara Harvey
 Kieran Lacroix
 Emma Rowsell
 Qaila Walji

Faculty of Science (3)

 Sara Abbass
 Mackenzie Huckvale
 Masouma Nakishbandi

Faculty of Engineering and Design (6)

 Firas Aboujamee
 Hamza Al-Khateeb   
 Olivia Arscott
 Arianna Conidi
 Cameron Davis
 Mohamad Deifallah

Sprott School of Business (2)

 Musab Chaudhry
 Noor Masad

2017/2018 Council Members
Term: May 1, 2017 – April 30, 2018

Faculty of Public Affairs (7) 
 Cameron Wales
 Julia Parsons
 Ryan Clancy 
 Brittanie Jonidi
 Jenny Giang
 Connor Thibodeau
 Jon MacDougall
Faculty of Arts and Social Sciences (7) 
 Lily Akagbosu
 Claudia Calagoure-Perna
 Scott Taylor 
 Julia Van Drie
 Carley Murphy
Faculty of Science (4) 
 Nima Dadar
 John Haddad
 Yvonne Osagie
 Hassan Zafar
Faculty of Engineering and Design (4) 
 Julia Dalphy
 Yannick Brisbois
 Ryan Herbrand
 Sarah Gorlough
Sprott School of Business (2) 
 Daniel Giacca
 Tom Whyte
Special Student (1) 
 Brendan Mcloughlin

Elections 
CUSA holds general elections every year. The association currently uses online voting and the instant-runoff voting system. Voter turnout in 2017 was over 37%.

Services

Businesses
Several businesses are provided by CUSA:
Ollie's
Roosters Coffee House
Haven

Service centres
The student union fees cover several services to students through service centres: 
Carleton Disability Awareness Centre (CDAC)
Unified Support Centre (USC)
Gender and Sexuality Resource Centre (GSRC)
Hatch
Mawandoseg Centre
Racialized and International Student Experience (RISE)
Wellness Centre
Women's Centre

Clubs and societies
CUSA oversee's over 200 recognized clubs and societies. CUSA also offers a number of different services to clubs and societies.

All clubs and societies, and services available to them, can be found at cusaclubs.ca

Controversies

Abortion rights
On December 5, 2006, CUSA voted 26-25-1-1 (26 in favour, 25 against, 1 abstaining, 1 absent) of supporting abortion rights, and discontinuing anti-abortion activism. This drew critical reactions from anti-abortion groups and from campus groups, such as the Carleton University Debating Society, that said CUSA was stifling open debate. Those in favour of the motion defended it as ensuring "women's rights" on campus. This vote was reversed in December 2012.

Shinerama cystic fibrosis fundraising controversy

In November 2008, the CUSA voted to drop its annual Shinerama cystic fibrosis fundraiser, in favour of a fundraiser for an as-yet-undetermined charity, because the illness is not "inclusive" enough. Shinerama is a fundraiser held at universities across Canada every fall in support of the Canadian Cystic Fibrosis Foundation (CCFF), first held in 1961; Carleton has participated for the past 25 years and has contributed nearly $1 million to the cause.

Donnie Northrup, CUSA councillor representing the Faculty of Science, introduced the motion which stated that cystic fibrosis "has been recently revealed to only affect white people, and primarily men" and that therefore, it was inappropriate for the CUSA to donate money to researching a cure. Supporters of the motion argued that "all orientees and volunteers should feel like their fundraising efforts will serve  diverse communities."

Reactions and Criticism
The CUSA was criticized for this decision since the motion did not reveal the source of the claim that cystic fibrosis affects only Caucasians. In fact, the CCFF's website states that: "The disease is most common in caucasians, but it can affect all races." Nick Bergamini, a CUSA council member who represents Journalism students, stated that "They're playing racial politics with something that is supposed to bring people together – a charity." Bergamini commented that "they see this, in their own twisted way, as a win for diversity. I see it as a loss for people with cystic fibrosis."

Cathleen Morrison, who is the CEO of the CCFF, stated in an interview with CTV News that although cystic fibrosis "does affect Caucasian populations primarily," the term Caucasian includes people from South Asia, North Africa, the Persian Gulf and Israel. Morrison explained that "These are Caucasian populations. These people do not have white skin. They have CF, it now seems, in the same ratios as other Caucasian people who do have white skin." Morrison also stated that cystic fibrosis affects just as many young girls as boys.

Jonathan Kay, a columnist for the National Post, blasted CUSA for this decision. Kay stated that "Even by the loopy standards of students governments, this has got to be a new low." Kay argued that cystic fibrosis, although it has a much higher rate of occurrence in caucasian males, affects all races and both genders. Kay also pointed out that many charity events raise money for breast cancer, even though it is primarily a female disease, and for Tay–Sachs disease, whose sufferers are almost exclusively Jewish. Editorial and opinion articles from the Ottawa Citizen have also condemned CUSA's actions with the editorial declaring that "when [a student association] does something as ignorant and thoughtless as Carleton University's did this week, the country pays attention."

Subsequent response by CUSA
CUSA president Brittany Smyth later stated that the council has been considering rotating the beneficiary of Shinerama instead of always giving the money to one charity, arguing that "It's about people wanting to do something different." Smyth said the colour of someone's skin wasn't at issue; rather, the decision was made to spread the university's fundraising efforts to other charities. In an interview with CTV news, Smyth stated that "There was some discussion about that issue but very small. Most of it was around just switching it up and doing something different for a change."

CUSA released a statement on November 26 indicating that the association's council would revisit their decision. Smyth stated, "It has become clear that there is not an appetite at Carleton to change from [Shinerama]... The responsible thing to do is to reverse the decision," adding that "the motion was never meant to imply that raising funds for Cystic Fibrosis research was not a worthwhile cause." Smyth announced an emergency meeting of CUSA's council to vote on a new motion to reinstate the charity. A unanimous vote at that meeting revoked the earlier decision, approved the restoration of next year's Shinerama campaign and also approved the publication of an apology over the matter. Donnie Northrup, the council representative responsible for moving the original motion to cancel Shinerama, resigned his position at CUSA as did another councillor, Sean Maguire. However, over the summer of 2009 Northrup was acclaimed back into CUSA. The meeting also received petitions demanding the resignation of Smyth and certain other councillors, although no actions on these were immediately taken.

Disqualification of a President-Elect

On February 13, 2009, Bruce Kyereh-Addo of the Demand Better slate was found to be in violation of the Consolidated Electoral Code on multiple counts and subsequently disqualified.  To date, Kyereh-Addo's disqualification was upheld by the electoral board.

2009 CFS referendum petition 
During the 2009–2010 school year, a group of students launched a petition to hold a referendum on possible disaffiliation of CUSA from the CFS. Stated reasoning for this referendum was to counter issues such as the claimed ineffectiveness of the CFS and interference in other university's unions. In a press release the petitioners stated that the CFS "made almost no gains as a lobby group in its 30 years of operation."  This was strongly denied by the CFS.

After several weeks a counter petition was created to try to bar the issue from going to a university-wide vote, which was controversially spearheaded by several CUSA officials.  Soon afterward CUSA officially endorsed the counter-petition by a vote of 17 in favour, 7 against and 9 abstaining.  The motion also mandates that CUSA members must advocate in favour of the CFS.  This has attracted more criticism toward CUSA by students who feel it should stay neutral and instead try to help students make an informed decision.  The pro-referendum petition ended up garnering over 2300 signatures before its submission to the CFS offices in Toronto. Despite being hand-delivered by a Bailiff, the CFS have stated they did not receive the petition.  A referendum at Carleton had previously been held in 1995, on the possibility of joining the newly formed Canadian Alliance of Student Associations (CASA), that lost narrowly.

Disqualification of VP Student Services
In 2016, Ashley Courchene,  a third year political science major, ran for Vice President Student Services under the slate Change. After winning the election by only 21 votes, the Chief Electoral Officer (CEO) Matt Swain disqualified the Change slate due to an alleged infraction by the assistant campaign manager Ahmad Gitteh and presidential candidate Abdullah Jabber, which led to Ashley Courchene's disqualification. Mr. Courchene successfully appealed the disqualification to the Electoral Board. Your Carleton then successfully appealed to the Constitutional Board (which overrides the electoral board).  Mr. Courchene then went to the Ontario Superior Court, which reinstated him to the position of VPSS.  Neither CUSA nor Your Carleton appealed the court's decision.

See also
List of Ontario students' associations

References

External links

CUSA Clubs & Societies
Carleton University
Carleton students union bans "anti-choice" activities"
Justice for Ash

Ontario students' associations
Students' Association